Airline Tycoon is a business simulation game by Thomas Holz and Robert Kleinert, in which the player must successfully manage an airline. The original was developed by Spellbound Entertainment, and published by Infogrames Deutschland, however, the succeeding versions were published by a variety of publishers.

The original Airline Tycoon was created for Windows, however, the later Deluxe version was also ported to Linux, Mac OS X, MorphOS, ZETA, iOS and Android.

Like other "tycoon" computer games, the objective of the game is to become a tycoon, and in this case, an "Airline Tycoon". This is achieved through the balance of income and expenditures.

Gameplay
It's a simulation computer game where the player acts as manager of an airline, competing against three other tycoons. The names of the four tycoons are: Tina Cortez (Sunshine Airways), Siggi Sorglos (Falcon Lines), Igor Tuppolevsky (Phoenix Travel) and Mario Zucchero (Honey Airlines).

The player must keep their aircraft in good shape and equip them at such a level as to keep the customers satisfied, buy new planes (from the expensive Airplane Agency or from Mr Schlauberger at the museum who sells old planes at a much lower cost) and take out bank loans if required.

The player must also manage their personnel, plan flights, buy fuel, attend meetings in the airport manager's office and, if there is the time, slip into Rick's café for a quick cup of coffee. The player can also perform sabotages on the other players.

The graphics are bright and decidedly tongue in cheek: the tycoon Igor Tuppolevsky has a set of Russian dolls on his desk—and an open tin of caviar, while Tina Cortez has a picture of a matador and a bull's head.

With a network, up to four people can play at once and the game status can be saved (as it can in single-player mode) for longer games.

History

Releases 
The original game was released in August 1998 in Germany by Infogrames Deutschland. It was not released in any English-speaking country; however, there was an official English demo.

The first Airline Tycoon title to be released in United States and the United Kingdom was Airline Tycoon First Class. It was published in 2001 by Monte Cristo; however, the publisher decided to remove First Class subtitle from the game box and manuals, though it remained in-game. Features added in First Class include ten brand new missions, multiplayer mode with up to 4 players, new MIDI music, cargo transportation and more.

In 2002, Airline Tycoon Evolution, second Airline Tycoon re-release was published by Monte Cristo. The game introduced ten new missions, possibility of buying self-designed aircraft (and possibility of sharing these planes via Internet), possibility of hiring aircraft security agents, five new sabotages and more.

In 2003, Spellbound Entertainment released a third Airline Tycoon addition, named Airline Tycoon Deluxe. It included all of previous versions, the only new part of the game was twenty new airports and possibility of accepting cargo from remote estates. Originally it was released in limited edition of 5000 items. It was available only in Germany, though it was not translated into other languages. However, Linux, Mac OS X and ZETA versions released in Autumn 2005 and Winter 2006 by RuneSoft are available in English, German and French.

On 24 March 2015 Airline Tycoon Deluxe was re-released on the digital distribution platform gog.com, including the source code.

Successor Airline Tycoon 2 
On May 24, 2006 Spellbound announced it would be releasing a full sequel to Airline Tycoon, Airline Tycoon II due to be released in Germany sometime in the second half of 2007. The release date was, however, not met. Spellbound stated they could not find a publisher for the game and announced no new release date.

On October 22, 2009 Airline Tycoon II was announced by Kalypso Media and scheduled to be released in late 2011. It was scheduled to be released in the United States on October 2, 2011 by Amazon.com, however, Kalypso Media scheduled their North American release for October 14, 2011. The Game as of date has been released and includes a demo version which the original lacked.

The first extra content or expansion for the game was announced on March 29, 2012. Honey Airlines DLC finally became available on April 19 of the same year. It would feature a new character, new airline company, two additional campaign missions and a Cargo area for the airport.

The second one, announced on May 31, 2012 called Falcon Lines DLC was eventually released on June 14 of that year. This DLC would add another character and airline company, another two additional campaign missions, the Last-Minute Counter as a new airport area and the ability to open branch offices anywhere throughout the world.

Reception 
Sales of Airline Tycoon surpassed 150,000 units worldwide by 2001.

In 2001 an IGN review gave Airline Tycoon a good rating with 7.9/10. Airline Tycoon 2 received on Metacritic a mediocre score of 57/100 from four reviews.

References

External links
Deluxe Version Homepage
Airline Tycoon 2 website

BeOS games
Business simulation games
Video games developed in Germany
Linux games
MacOS games
MorphOS games
RuneSoft games
Embracer Group franchises
Windows games
1998 video games
Multiplayer and single-player video games
Commercial video games with freely available source code
Spellbound Entertainment games